Raymond Albert Romano (born December 21, 1957)  is an American stand-up comedian, actor and screenwriter. He is best known for his role as Ray Barone on the CBS sitcom Everybody Loves Raymond, for which he received an Emmy Award, and as the voice of Manny in the Ice Age film series. He created and starred in the TNT comedy drama Men of a Certain Age (2009–2011). From 2012 to 2015, Romano had a recurring role as Hank Rizzoli, a love interest of Sarah Braverman in the NBC series Parenthood. More recently, he co-starred in the romantic comedy The Big Sick (2017) and portrayed mob lawyer Bill Bufalino in Martin Scorsese's epic crime film The Irishman (2019). Since 2017, Romano has portrayed Rick Moreweather in the Epix comedy-drama series Get Shorty.

Early life
Romano was born in Queens, New York City, the second son of Luciana "Lucie" ( Fortini), a piano teacher, and Albert Romano (1925–2010), a real estate agent and engineer. He is of Italian descent. He grew up in the Forest Hills neighborhood of Queens. He has an older brother, Richard (born 1956), a sergeant with the NYPD, and a younger brother, Robert (born c. 1966), a second grade teacher in New York City.

Romano attended elementary and middle school at Our Lady Queen of Martyrs in Forest Hills. After transferring from Archbishop Molloy High School, Romano graduated from Hillcrest High School in 1975. He was in the same high school class as Fran Drescher. Before getting into show business, Romano briefly attended Queens College, in Flushing, New York, where he studied accounting.

Career
His early comedy career started when he competed in the Johnnie Walker Comedy Search in 1989 directed by Saturday Night Live short film producer Neal Marshad and appeared on The Comedy Channel. His career included many outlets, such as Comedy Central, where he had been a recurring guest voice on the show Dr. Katz, Professional Therapist. He also was a contestant on Star Search in the stand-up comedy category. He originally was cast to play Joe (originally named Rick) on the American television sitcom NewsRadio, but was fired and replaced by Joe Rogan. He then appeared on Late Show with David Letterman doing his stand up routine which formed his ties with CBS. Shortly thereafter, he became the star of his own show, Everybody Loves Raymond on CBS, that featured a cast and format more suitable to Romano's brand of humor. His work on the series earned him six Primetime Emmy Award nominations as Outstanding Lead actor in a Comedy Series, a category he won in 2002. He also shared two Emmy Awards as an executive producer when his show won as Outstanding Comedy Series in 2003 and 2005.

Romano performed the opening monologue at the 1998 White House Correspondents' Association dinner.

Romano and his comedian friend Kevin James starred in the salesman comedy Grilled as two average Joes of the same profession who are both desperate to land a big sale.

Romano was featured on a 2000 episode of Who Wants to Be a Millionaire, on which he won $125,000 for the NYPD's D.A.R.E. unit. The following year, he and one of his brothers appeared on a New York Police Department recruiting poster.

In 2004, Romano became the highest-paid television actor in history for his role of Raymond on CBS's Everybody Loves Raymond. The show broke another record by having the highest revenue, at $3.9 billion.

On December 13, 2003, Romano was a guest star, sending a birthday card to Bob Barker for Barker's 80th birthday on the 27th "Million Dollar Spectacular" special of the CBS game show The Price Is Right.

Romano was the subject of the documentary film 95 Miles to Go. The film documents Romano's road trip for a series of rides across the south of the United States. The film was released in theaters on April 7, 2010, by ThinkFilm. In August 2006 Romano was interviewed in front of a live audience at UCLA by fellow stand-up veteran David Steinberg, for an episode of Sit Down Comedy with David Steinberg. The program first aired on the TV Land network in March 2007.

Romano returned to television with a new dramedy for TNT in 2008, Men of a Certain Age, which he co-created with former Everybody Loves Raymond writer Mike Royce. It co-starred Scott Bakula and Andre Braugher.

Romano made an appearance in the seventh season of NBC series The Office as Merv Bronte, a nervous job applicant interviewing for the job left vacant by Michael Scott.

Romano made an appearance in the third-season premiere of ABC sitcom The Middle as Nicky, a friend of Mike, who ruined his and Frankie's honeymoon. Romano was the second actor from Everybody Loves Raymond to be reunited with Patricia Heaton on The Middle. Doris Roberts guest-starred in three episodes.

He joined the cast of Parenthood beginning with its fourth season premiere. He became a semi-regular, playing photographer Hank Rizzoli, who hired and later had a romantic relationship with Sarah Braverman and developed a friendship with her nephew who has Asperger syndrome. The role was specifically created for him after he expressed his love for the series and met with creator Jason Katims on the set of Friday Night Lights.

In 2002, Romano voiced the woolly mammoth Manfred (Manny) in the film Ice Age, and its sequels Ice Age: The Meltdown in 2006, Ice Age: Dawn of the Dinosaurs in 2009, Ice Age: Continental Drift in 2012, and Ice Age: Collision Course in 2016.

From 2017 to 2019, Romano played a leading role in three seasons of the MGM+ television show Get Shorty, created by Davey Holmes and co-starring Chris O'Dowd.

In 2019, Romano starred in the Netflix comedy film Paddleton and portrayed mob lawyer Bill Bufalino in Martin Scorsese's The Irishman.

Romano is set to play Jim Valvano in an upcoming movie about the former NC State Wolfpack basketball coach.

Competitions

Romano competed in the World Series of Poker in 2007, 2008, 2009, 2010, 2011, 2013 and 2015.

In early 2010, Romano starred in the second season of The Golf Channel's original series The Haney Project in which Tiger Woods' former coach Hank Haney attempts to improve the golf games of different celebrities and athletes. Romano's goal was to finish the show being able to break 80.  Romano took time off from the show to be with his father, Albert Romano, who died in March 2010. Romano is also a regular competitor in the AT&T Pebble Beach National Pro-Am, where he finished fifth in 2012 with his partner, Australian professional Steven Bowditch. It was the first time Romano had qualified for the final round after failing to do so on 11 successive occasions. He also competes annually in the American Century Championship, a celebrity golf tournament owned by NBC and held at Lake Tahoe each July.

Personal life
Romano married his wife, Anna Scarpulla, in 1987. They met while working at a bank together. Romano's character's daughter on Everybody Loves Raymond was named after his real-life daughter, Alexandra "Ally" Romano. Also, in the series pilot, Ray and Debra's twin boys were named Gregory and Matthew, after Romano's real-life twin sons, but Romano felt it was inconvenient to have all his television children have the same names as his real children and changed the twins' names to Geoffrey and Michael onscreen. He also said his brother was not pleased with Ray Barone's television brother.

Romano's family has made various appearances in the show. Romano's daughter made several appearances on Everybody Loves Raymond as Molly, the best friend of his on-screen daughter, Ally, and the daughter of Ray Barone's nemesis, Peggy the Cookie Lady. Romano's father, Albert Romano, has made various appearances as Albert, one of Frank Barone's lodge buddies in various episodes, such as "Debra at the Lodge", and "Boys' Therapy". Romano's brother, Richard Romano, appeared in the episodes "Golf For It", "Just a Formality", and "The Toaster". Romano's wife, Anna, appeared as one of the moms in the background at Geoffrey and Michael's school in season 6's episode titled "The Angry Family".

In February 2012, Romano revealed that his wife, Anna, had successfully battled stage one breast cancer in 2010. Romano told People magazine that "the reason we're going public is to share our experience, yeah, but to have an effect. Our goal is to help people."

Romano was close friends with Doris Roberts, who played Marie Barone, Ray Barone's mother, on Everybody Loves Raymond. At the time of her death, Romano said he was inspired by her desire to continue learning throughout her life. She also served as a mentor, helping him to feel more comfortable on set.

Filmography

Film

Television

Video games

Writing credits

Everybody Loves Raymond
In addition to his roles as star and producer of Everybody Loves Raymond, Romano also co-wrote the following episodes:
Season one
"Why Are We Here?" (with Tom Paris)
Season two
"Golf" (with Tom Caltabiano and Kevin James)
"The Wedding" (with Philip Rosenthal)
Season three
"Ray Home Alone" (with Tucker Cawley)
"How They Met" (with Philip Rosenthal)
Season four
"Debra's Workout" (with Tom Caltabiano and Mike Royce)
"Bad Moon Rising" (with Philip Rosenthal)
Season five
"Super Bowl" (with Mike Royce)
Season six
"Jealous Robert" (with Tom Caltabiano)
"Talk to Your Daughter" (with Tucker Cawley)
"The First Time" (with Tom Caltabiano and Mike Royce)
Season seven
"She's the One" (with Philip Rosenthal)
"The Bachelor Party" (with Mike Royce and Tom Caltabiano)
Season nine
"Angry Sex" (with Lew Schneider and Mike Scully)

Men of a Certain Age
Season one
"Pilot" (with Mike Royce)
"Let It Go" (with Mike Royce)
"Back in the Shit" (teleplay) with Mike Royce
Season two
"If I Could, I Surely Would" (with Mike Royce)

Discography
 Live at Carnegie Hall (2001, Columbia) - CD

Bibliography
 Everything and a Kite (non-fiction) (1999)
 Raymie, Dickie and the Bean (children's) (2005)
 Everybody Loves Raymond: Our Family Album (2004)

Awards and nominations

References

External links

 
 

1957 births
20th-century American male actors
21st-century American male actors
American accountants
American male film actors
American male television actors
American male voice actors
American people of Italian descent
American stand-up comedians
Archbishop Molloy High School alumni
Lee Strasberg Theatre and Film Institute alumni
Living people
Columbia Records artists
Outstanding Performance by a Lead Actor in a Comedy Series Primetime Emmy Award winners
People from Forest Hills, Queens
Hillcrest High School alumni (Queens)
Queens College, City University of New York alumni
American poker players
20th-century American comedians
21st-century American comedians
American atheists